Domenico "Domingo" Ghirardelli (February 21, 1817 – January 17, 1894) was an Italian-born  chocolatier who was the founder of the Ghirardelli Chocolate Company in San Francisco, California.

Biography

Early life
Domenico Ghirardelli was born on February 21, 1817, in Rapallo, Italy, to Giuseppe and Maddalena ( Ferretto) Ghirardelli. His father was a spice merchant in Genoa. In his teens, he apprenticed at Romanengo, a noted chocolatier in Genoa.

At about the age of twenty, in 1838, he moved to Uruguay, then in 1838 to Lima, Peru, where he established a confectionery, and began using the Spanish equivalent of his Italian name, Domingo. In 1849 he moved to California on the recommendation of his former neighbor, James Lick, who had brought 600 pounds of chocolate with him to San Francisco in 1848. Caught up in the California Gold Rush, he opened his first store in a mining camp to sell sweets and treats to miners who were lacking the small pleasures of life. Ghirardelli spent a few months in the gold fields near Sonora and Jamestown, before becoming a merchant in Hornitos, California.

Career

In 1852, he moved to San Francisco and established the Ghirardelli Chocolate Company at what would come to be known as Ghirardelli Square. According to the San Francisco Chronicle he is San Francisco's most successful chocolatier.

Around the year 1865, a worker at the Ghirardelli factory discovered that by hanging a bag of ground cacao beans in a warm room, the cocoa butter would drip off, leaving behind a residue that could then be converted into ground chocolate. This technique, known as the Broma process is now the most common method used for the production of chocolate.

Personal life
Ghirardelli married Elisabetta Corsini (nicknamed "Bettina"), a native of Italy, in 1837. She died in 1846.

Ghirardelli married Carmen Alvarado Martin (1830–1887) in Lima, Peru, in 1847. Her first husband had been a French physician who had been lost at sea, and she had an eight-month-old child, Carmen. He and Carmen had seven children:  Virginia (1847-1867); Domenico, Jr. (1849-1932); Joseph Nicholas (1852-1906); Elvira (1856–1908); Louis (1857–1902); Angela (1859-1936); and Eugene Gustave (1860–?).

Death
He died on January 17, 1894, in Rapallo, Italy from influenza. His body was buried at Mountain View Cemetery in Oakland, California along with the rest of his family.

See also

Ghirardelli Chocolate Company
Ghirardelli Square

References
Notes

Citations

External links

1817 births
1894 deaths
Italian emigrants to the United States
Businesspeople from San Francisco
People of the California Gold Rush
Food and drink in the San Francisco Bay Area
Chocolatiers
Businesspeople in confectionery
19th-century American inventors
Burials at Mountain View Cemetery (Oakland, California)
19th-century American businesspeople